Leven is one of the six wards used to elect members of the West Dunbartonshire Council. It elects four Councillors.

The ward covers the southern parts of the Vale of Leven including Alexandria, Bonhill, Dalmonach and Renton, plus northern parts of Dumbarton: streets north/west of Townend Road including the modern Lomondgate development and Broadmeadow Industrial Estate, and the entire Bellsmyre area.

Councillors

Election results

2022 Election
2022 West Dunbartonshire Council election

2017 Election
2017 West Dunbartonshire Council election

2012 Election
2012 West Dunbartonshire Council election

2007 Election
2007 West Dunbartonshire Council election

References

Wards of West Dunbartonshire
Vale of Leven
Dumbarton